Federal Polytechnic, Ilaro is a polytechnic based in Ogun State, Southwestern Nigeria.

The Institute of Chartered Accountants of Nigeria has recognised the polytechnic as the only one in Nigeria that has maintained high standards of tuition in accountancy.

Faculties 
The institution has six faculties, namely:
School of Management Studies
School of Environmental Studies
School of Engineering
School of Applied Science
School of information  Communication and Technology(SCIT)
School of Part-Time Studies

References

Education in Ogun State
Educational institutions established in 1979
1979 establishments in Nigeria
Federal polytechnics in Nigeria